Barbania is a comune (municipality) in the Metropolitan City of Turin in the Italian region Piedmont, located about  north of Turin. It is in the middle of the Malone river plain.

Barbania borders the following municipalities: Rivara, Busano, Rocca Canavese, Levone, and Vauda Canavese. It originates from a Salassi Celtic village founded around  the late 5th century BC. In the Middle Ages it was a free commune (11th century), until it was conquered by Philip I of Piedmont in 1305; thenceforth its history is connected with the Duchy of Savoy.

References

Cities and towns in Piedmont
Canavese
Populated places established in the 5th century BC